Jonathan David Cook (born 14 December 1989) is an Australian cricketer. He made his Twenty20 debut for Sydney Thunder in the 2018–19 Big Bash League season on 24 December 2018.

References

External links
 

1989 births
Living people
Australian cricketers
Sydney Thunder cricketers
Place of birth missing (living people)
People from the Mid North Coast
Cricketers from New South Wales